"Give Me Just a Little More Time" is the debut single by Chairmen of the Board, released in 1970 through Capitol Records on Holland–Dozier–Holland's Invictus Records label.

"Give Me Just a Little More Time", backed with "Since the Days of Pigtails & Fairytales", peaked at No. 3 on the Billboard Hot 100 in the United States, making it the best-performing of the Chairmen's singles, and the first of the Chairmen's four Billboard Hot 100 top 40 pop hits. The single also peaked at No. 8 on the Billboard R&B Singles chart. It sold more than one million copies in the US. In the United Kingdom, the song reached No. 3 on the UK Singles Chart in September 1970. The first Chairmen of the Board LP, a self-titled release, included the single; after the single's success, the Chairmen of the Board album was reissued as Give Me Just a Little More Time.

Background
The song was written and produced by Brian Holland, Lamont Dozier, Edward Holland, Jr., and Ron Dunbar. Because of the then still-pending lawsuit against Holland-Dozier-Holland from their former employers, Motown, the trio credited themselves with the pseudonym "Edythe Wayne" for this song and many other early Invictus/Hot Wax releases. "Give Me Just a Little More Time" features Chairmen of the Board lead singer General Johnson as the narrator, (backed by group members Danny Woods, Harrison Kennedy and Eddie Custis) begging a sweetheart not to rush intimacy: "We both want the sweetness in life/ But these things don't come overnight."
Members of Motown's in-house band, The Funk Brothers, who played all of Holland-Dozier-Holland's previous hits, played on this recording as well as many other Invictus/Hot Wax productions.

Personnel

The Funk Brothers who played on "Give Me Just A Little More Time" included:
 Bass: Bob Babbitt
 Guitarists: Dennis Coffey, Eddie Willis, and Ray Monette
 Keyboards: Johnny Griffith
 Drums: Richard "Pistol" Allen
 Percussion: Jack Ashford

Chart history

Weekly charts

Year-end charts

Kylie Minogue version

"Give Me Just a Little More Time" was covered in 1992 by Australian pop singer Kylie Minogue. Minogue's version was featured in a then-current commercial for Accurist watches. It was one of the last tracks to be recorded for her fourth album, Let's Get to It. It peaked at number two on the UK Singles Chart, assisted by its techno oriented B-side "Do You Dare?" and sold 325,000 copies.
"Give Me Just a Little More Time" was later added to Minogue's 1992 compilation album Greatest Hits. Additionally, it is the only song from Let's Get to It to be included on Minogue's career-spanning compilations Ultimate Kylie, The Best of Kylie Minogue and the standard version of Step Back in Time: The Definitive Collection. "Give Me Just a Little More Time" was performed in various television shows at the time of release, but it was not included on the Let's Get to It Tour. The first performance of the song in a tour would be on the Anti Tour in 2012. The B-side "Do You Dare?" was included on Minogue's Greatest Remixes (Vol. 2), and was mixed on the "Everything Taboo" medley on her Showgirl: The Greatest Hits Tour, Showgirl: The Homecoming Tour, and For You, for Me concert tours.

Pete Waterman stated:I went to bed, and, and I literally was in bed thinking of all these records that I had in my life [...] I was going through the library mentally thinking, what song would she never have done that we could do that was just a great song. And one of my favorite songs was Chairman of the Board's "Give Me Just a Little More Time."He ran downstairs to his record label to find the track. The song was played to Minogue the next morning.

Formats and track listings
These are the formats and track listings of major single releases of "Give Me Just a Little More Time".

UK CD single (PWCD212)
 "Give Me Just a Little More Time" — 3:07
 "Give Me Just a Little More Time" (Extended Version) — 4:33
 "Do You Dare?" (NRG Mix) — 7:04
 "Do You Dare?" (New Rave Mix) — 6:40

UK 7" vinyl single (PWL212)
 "Give Me Just a Little More Time" — 3:07
 "Do You Dare?" (NRG Edit) — 3:17

UK 12" vinyl single (PWLT212)
 "Give Me Just a Little More Time" (Extended Version) — 4:33
 "Do You Dare?" (NRG Mix) — 7:04
 "Do You Dare?" (New Rave Mix) — 6:40

2009 UK iTunes bundle & 2018 digital EP 
 "Give Me Just a Little More Time" — 3:07
 "Give Me Just a Little More Time" (Extended Version) — 4:33
 "Give Me Just a Little More Time" (Instrumental) — 3:05
 "Give Me Just a Little More Time" (Backing Track) — 3:06
 "Do You Dare?" (NRG Mix) — 7:04
 "Do You Dare?" (New Rave Mix) — 6:40
 "Do You Dare?" (Italia 12" Mix) — 5:22
 "Do You Dare?" (NRG Edit) — 3:17
 "Do You Dare?" (New Rave Instrumental) — 6:38

Charts and sales

Weekly charts

Year-end charts

Sales

Live Performances
Minogue performed the song on the following concert tours:
 Showgirl: The Greatest Hits Tour ("Brrr" excerpt during the "Smiley Kylie Medley")
 Showgirl: The Homecoming Tour ("Brrr" excerpt during the "Everything Taboo Medley")
 For You, for Me ("Brrr" excerpt during the "Everything Taboo" Medley")
 Anti Tour (Performed in London)

Other cover versions
In 1982, American R&B singer Angela Clemmons remade the song and it peaked at #4 on Billboard's Dance/Disco Top 80 Singles chart.

References

External links
"Give Me Just a Little More Time" - Lyrics

1970 songs
1970 debut singles
1992 singles
Chairmen of the Board songs
Kylie Minogue songs
Pete Waterman Entertainment singles
Song recordings produced by Stock Aitken Waterman
Songs written by Holland–Dozier–Holland
Song recordings produced by Lamont Dozier
Song recordings produced by Brian Holland
Songs written by Ron Dunbar